Statistics of Kuwaiti Premier League for the 1998–99 season.

Overview
It was contested by 14 teams, and Al Qadisiya Kuwait won the championship.

First stage

Second stage

Group 1

Group 2

Group 3

Championship play-offs

Quarterfinals

Semifinals

Third place match

Final

References
Kuwait – List of final tables (RSSSF)

1998-99
1
1998–99 in Asian association football leagues